Vallejo is a common Spanish surname. Notable people with the name include:

 Alfonso Vallejo (1943–2021), Spanish playwright, poet, painter and neurologist
 Andrés Vallejo, Ecuadorian politician
 Antonio Buero Vallejo (1916–2000), Spanish playwright associated with the Generation of '36 movement
 Boris Vallejo (born 1941), Peruvian-born American painter
 Camila Vallejo (born 1988), Chilean student leader
 Carlos Amigo Vallejo (born 1934), O.F.M., Cardinal Priest and Archbishop Emeritus of Seville
 César Vallejo (1892–1938), influential Peruvian poet
 Demetrio Vallejo (1912–1985), Mexican railroad worker and union activist
 Diego Vallejo (born 1973), Spanish rally co-driver
 Elliot Vallejo (born 1984), American football player
 Fausto Vallejo (born 1949), Mexican politician
 Fernando Vallejo (born 1942), Colombian novelist and filmmaker
 Francisco Vallejo Pons (born 1982), Spanish chess Grandmaster
 Gaby Vallejo Canedo (born 1941), Bolivian writer
 Georgette Vallejo (1908–1984), French writer and poet, wife of César Vallejo
 Iván Vallejo (born 1959), Ecuadorian mountaineer
 Jesús Vallejo (born 1997), Spanish footballer
 Joaquín Vallejo Arbeláez (1912–2005), Colombian politician and writer
 Juan Carlos Vallejo (born 1963), Spanish retired swimmer
 Juana Vallejo, Ecuadorian television producer and politician
 Linda Vallejo (born 1951), American artist
 Manu Vallejo (born 1997), Spanish professional footballer 
 Mariano Guadalupe Vallejo (1807–1890), California politician and general
 Maximiliano Vallejo (born 1982), Argentine soccer player
 Melanie Vallejo (born 1979), Australian actress
 Miguel Ángel Vallejo (born 1990), Mexican soccer player
 Tanner Vallejo (born 1994), American football player
 Tito Vallejo (born 1948), Gibraltarian historian and former military officer
 Virginia Vallejo (born 1949), Colombian writer, journalist, columnist, media personality and socialite
 Felipe Vallejo (born 1925),Spanish artist Rafael García de la Borbolla's uncle

Fictional characters 
Junior Commissioner Vallejo, a fictional character from the cartoon Fillmore!

See also
Vallejos (surname)
Vallejo (disambiguation)

Spanish-language surnames